This is a list of episodes for BBC British sitcom Don't Wait Up, which aired between 1983 and 1990.

Series overview

Episodes

Series 1 (1983)

Series 2 (1984)

Series 3 (1985–86)

Series 4 (1987)

Series 5 (1988)

Series 6 (1990)

References

External links
 http://www.phill.co.uk/comedy/dwu/list.html
 

Lists of British sitcom episodes